Tehran, the capital of Iran, possesses more than 800 well-kept parks.

Recreational parks
Gheytarieh Park, in Gheytarieh
Jahan-e Kudak Park, in Davoodiyeh
Jamshidieh Park
Laleh Park
Mellat Park
Niavaran Park
Park-e Shahr
Saei Park, in Valiasr Street
Shatranj Park

Forest parks
Chitgar Park
Lavizan Forest Park
Vard-Avard Forest Park

National parks
Khajeer National Park
Kaveer National Park
Lar Protected Natural Habitat
Varjeen Protected Natural Habitat

Other parks
Azadi Sport Complex park
Pardisan
Ab-o-Atash Park, founded in 2009

 
Tehran
Parks
Parks